Jaan Pechaan is a 1991 family-drama Indian Hindi film directed by Kamal Saigal and produced by Ravie Sonie. It starred Utpal Dutt, Radha Asrani, Birbal, Sudha Chandran, Meera Madhuri, Arun Mathur, Shekhar Suman and Satish Shah in lead roles. Music for the film was scored by Iqbal Gill.

Songs
"Ankhiyan Milake Mujhe Pyar Sikhake" - Anuradha Paudwal
"Baharon Mein Nazaron Mein" - Shabbir Kumar, Kavita Krishnamurthy
"Jo Bhi Kahoongi Main Sach Kahoongi" - Anuradha Paudwal
"Mohabbat Na Karna Zamana Bura Hai" - Iqbal Gill
"Mujhko Mohabbat Hai Tumse" - Kavita Krishnamurthy

References

External links 
 
 

1990s Hindi-language films
Indian drama films
1991 drama films
1991 films
Hindi-language drama films